The grey laughingthrush (Garrulax maesi) is a species of bird in the family Leiothrichidae.
It is found in southern China, far northern Laos and Vietnam.
Its natural habitats are subtropical or tropical moist lowland forest and subtropical or tropical moist montane forest.

References

grey laughingthrush
Birds of South China
grey laughingthrush
Taxonomy articles created by Polbot